Terence Main is a Contemporary American artist and designer born in 1954.  He received his BA from the Herron School of Art and Design in 1976, and his MFA from Cranbrook Academy of Art in 1978.

Main is best known for the cast metal and stone sculptural furniture that he has been making for more than 30 years, such as Fourth Frond Chair in the collection of the Metropolitan Museum of Art.

Solo exhibitions and Commissions
2019 Peter Marino, My Eames is True, Louis Viuttton
2011-2015 Peter Marino, Five, cast aluminum bench for Christian Dior showrooms-
Beijing, Shanghai, Florence, Hong Kong, Tokyo, Miami and other worldwide Dior showrooms.
2015 The Turning Line, Herron School of Art and Design, 2015 Distinguished Alumnus Award, Indianapolis, IN
2002 Terra Incognita, Installation at 143 West 26th Street, New York, NY.
1997 Guerrillas, Art et Industrie, New York, NY.
1996 Terrestrial Tale, Art et Industrie, New York, NY.
1991  Inflorescence, Art et Industrie, New York, NY.
1990  Exhibition Evolution: from New York, Manufactory Gallery, Tokyo.
1989 Apparitions, Art et Industrie, New York, NY.
1988  Hellbenders, Art et Industrie, New York, NY.
1983  The Future Isn't What It Used To Be, International Design Conference, Aspen, CO.
1982  Third Stream, Art et Industrie, New York, NY.

Selected group exhibitions
2015 "Art et Industrie", exhibition and publication, New York, NY
2014 "Design Miami", Magen H Gallery, Miami, FL
 2011  Highlights from the Modern Design Collection, 1900 To the Present, Part II, Metropolitan Museum of Art, NYC. Thinking Big: Recent Design Acquisitions, Brooklyn Museum, Brooklyn, NY.
 2009   Magen H Gallery Opens New Space!, Magen H Gallery, New York, NY.
 2008 Design Miami/New York, Magen H Gallery, New York, NY. 	    Art Basel, via Magen H Gallery, Switzerland 	    Design Miami/Basel, via Magen H Gallery, Miami Beach, FL. 	    Design London, via Magen H Gallery, Berkeley Square, London.
 2007	    Structure Et Surface, Harris Lieberman Gallery, New York, NY.
 2006    Design Miami/Basel, Miami Beach, FL.
 2005	    Modernism, Seventh Regiment Armory, New York, NY. 	    Design Miami/Basel, Magen H Gallery Miami Preview, Miami Beach, FL.
 2003	    Significant Objects from the Modern Design Collection, Metropolitan Museum of Art  	    Group Exhibition, Rosenberg + Kaufman Fine Art, New York, NY. 	    The Sculpted Seat, Leo Kaplan Modern, New York, NY.
 2002	    Magnet, Yassine Art Gallery, Dakar, Senegal.
 2001	    A Century of Design Part IV: 1975-2000, Metropolitan Museum of Art, New York, NY.
 2000    Important Postwar and Contemporary Design, Icon20, New York, NY.
 1999	    Summer Group Show, Leo Kaplan Modern, New York, NY.
 1998	   Agitating Utopia, Cranbrook Academy of Art, Bloomfield Hills, MI.
 1997	   Get Out, John Elder Gallery, New York, NY.   	   Form Function or Metaphor, Paint Creek Center for the Arts, Rochester, NY. 	   Sit on this, The Chair as Art, PBCC Museum of Contemporary Art, Lake Worth, FL.
 1996	   Form Over Function, Virginia Museum of Fine Arts, Richmond, VA. .
 1995	   Building the Collection, Cranbrook Academy of Art Museum, Bloomfield Hills, MI.
 1994   Modern Furniture, Metropolitan Museum of Art, New York, NY.
 1993   Modern Metalwork, The Metropolitan Museum of Art, New York, NY.  	    Art and Application, Turbulence, New York, NY.
 1990	     The Humanist Icon, Ulrich Museum of Art, Wichita, KS; The Fralin Museum of Art, Charlottesville, Virginia 	      Functional Art, New York, Brutus Gallery, Osaka, Japan. 	      Mondrian auf der Tube, Foundation for Constructivist and Concrete Art, Zurich.
1984Works on Paper, Pompeii Gallery, New York, NY.
1983 Ornamentalism, Blanton Museum of Art, Austin, TX; Hudson River Museum, Yonkers, NY.

External links
 terencemain.com [www.terencemain.com]
 Terence Main Art From the Metropolitan Museum Of Art's permanent Collection 
 Terence Main- The Bronze Door Man 
 Terence Main's "Urban Guerrilla" 

American designers
American sculptors
Modern sculptors
Living people
Year of birth missing (living people)
Herron School of Art and Design alumni
Cranbrook Academy of Art alumni